Grégory Arganese is a French professional rugby union player. He plays at hooker for Bayonne in the Top 14.

References

External links
Ligue Nationale De Rugby Profile
European Professional Club Rugby Profile
Bayonne Profile

1982 births
Living people
People from Castres
French rugby union players
Sportspeople from Tarn (department)
Rugby union hookers